In aeronautics, Distributed propulsion is an arrangement in which the propulsive and related air flows are distributed over the aerodynamic surfaces of an aircraft. The purpose is to improve the craft's aerodynamic, propulsive and/or structural efficiency over an equivalent conventional design.

Anticipated benefits include improved fuel efficiency, emissions, noise, landing field length and handling.

Distributed propulsion may be accomplished by spanwise distribution of partially or fully embedded multiple small engines or fans along the wing. Alternatively, it may involve ducting exhaust gases along the wing's entire trailing edge.

Design principles

Definition
Distributed propulsion on an aircraft is typically characterised not only by the distributed nature of the propulsive thrust but also by utilisation of the effect this has on the aircraft aerodynamics. The propulsive air flows are distributed over the aerodynamic surfaces of the craft, typically spanwise over a fixed wing. These flows may interact with other air flowing over the wing and substantially affect the aerodynamics. However there is no accepted formal definition.

Three broad classes of distributed propulsion system have been identified:
Distributed exhaust, such as jet flaps.
Multiple discrete propulsors (fans, propellers or jets), which may be powered individually or by remote drive from fewer engines.
Cross-flow fans, which are a type of horizontal-axis rotor.

Aerodynamic functions 
In addition to providing propulsion, distributed propulsion arrangements have been studied with a view to providing various aerodynamic functions. These include:
 Direct reenergizing of the boundary layer
 Flow separation control
 Powered lift/circulation control
 Viscous drag reduction
 Vortex/vorticity control
 Vehicle control/vectored thrust

Potential benefits 
Several areas have been identified in which distributed propulsion may offer benefits over conventional designs. These include fuel efficiency, noise abatement, steep climbing for short take off and landing (STOL), novel control approaches (in particular eliminating control surfaces for roll, pitch and yaw moments), and high bypass ratios. It has also been suggested that smaller propulsors will be cheaper to manufacture and easier to handle during assembly and maintenance.

Distributed propulsors 
The multiple propulsion unit strategy involves three or more propulsion units. These units are arranged in Leader or Follower configurations. They are classified into five intensity classes (A–E) and three thrust-to-weight ratio categories (I-III). They can be arranged within/above/around or across the wing(s)/fuselage(s) or airframe.

Leader arrangements employ propulsion units to directly generate thrust, i.e., distributed engines. The Follower arrangement uses secondary  propulsion unit(s), such as multiple fans that are powered by a single engine. In the last case, the power transmission between the fans and engines may be linked by ducting hot gas, mechanical gears, or electric power lines.

Distributed electric propulsion 
Distributed electric propulsion (DEP) comprises multiple small fans or propellers driven by electric motors. Typically, each individual thruster is direct driven by its own relatively small and lightweight electric motor. The electrical power may be provided by any suitable source.

The advantages of distributed propulsion for lightweight, high aspect ratio solar-powered aeroplanes are exemplified in the AeroVironment HALSOL/Pathfinder/Helios projects, begun in 1983, and the University of Michigan X-HALE, flown from around 2012. Distributing the electric motors along the span was able to control how the airframe flexed in flight, allowing the structure to be much lighter than the conventional rigid equivalent.

Aeroelasticity
When heavy propulsion units are distributed along a wing, this allows the wing structure to be made lighter. However their weight and thrust can interact with the natural tendency of the wing to flex under varying loads (aeroelasticity). This can cause problems, for example it was a major cause of a crash involving the NASA Helios research aircraft. One solution investigated is the use of active aeroelastic controls to correct or even make use of wing flexing during flight.

History 
Multi-engine installations have been a feature of aeroplanes since the introduction of the Sikorsky Ilya Muromets shortly before World War One. However most do not significantly modify the airflow over the wings and are not always treated as distributed propulsion.

In 1963 the Hunting H.126 research aircraft was built to investigate the direct use of a jet flap for propulsion, while the ShinMaywa US-2 flying boat of 2003 used blown flaps to improve short takeoff and landing (STOL) performance and subsequently entered production.

FanWing began development of the crossflow fan as a combined lift and propulsion system in 1997 and over the next few years flew several models and research drones. Subsequent research in the US focused on the use of a crossflow fan inset into the wing upper trailing edge, as the primary driver for boundary layer control and jet flap propulsion.

More recently, several unmanned aerial vehicle (UAV) projects have explored the potential of distributed propulsion to offer noise abatement, fuel efficiency and short-field performance. As of 2022 a manned X-plane, the X-57 Maxwell is under development at NASA and several prototypes of a light aircraft, the Lilium Jet, have flown in Germany.

List of aircraft with distributed propulsion 
Aurora XV-24 LightningStrike: Distributed electric fans. Research UAV. Flew in 2016.
FanWing: Cross-flow fan. Series of research UAVs.
Hunting H.126: Jet-flap. Manned research aircraft. Flew from 1963.
Lilium Jet: Distributed electric fans. Series of manned prototypes.
NASA X-57 Maxwell (Sceptor): Distributed electric fans. Manned research aircraft. Under development.

References 

Aircraft propulsion components